Anoplognathus rugosus, commonly known as washerwoman, is a beetle of the family Scarabaeidae native to eastern Australia and Tasmania.

References

Scarabaeidae
Beetles described in 1818
Beetles of Australia
Taxa named by William Kirby (entomologist)